Dieter Riedel (born 16 September 1947) is a German former football player and coach. From 1995 to 1997, he was the chairman of Dynamo Dresden.

Club career 
Riedel, a strong dribbler standing only 1.70 m tall, began his career with BSG Stahl Gröditz. He joined Dynamo Dresden in 1966, forming a legendary duo with Gert Heidler.

Between 1967 and 1981, Riedel played 211 DDR-Oberliga matches and scored 49 goals. In this time, the club won the GDR championship 5 times and the FDGB Cup twice. In his 54 matches for the FDGB Cup, Riedel scored 14 goals.

On 20 September 1967, Riedel scored his team's first goal in the Europacup, from a distance of 20 meters against the Glasgow Rangers in the Inter-Cities Fairs Cup. In the European Cup competitions, he played in a total of 46 matches and scored eight goals.

International career 
Up to 1978, Riedel played in four international matches for East Germany national football team. He was also part of the team which won the gold medal at the 1976 Summer Olympics in Montreal. In 1983, as an assistant of Klaus Sammer, he took over Dynamo Dresden training. On 26 August 1995, after the arrest of Rolf Jürgen Otto, Riedel became president of the association. He remained in this office until 2 September 1997.

Personal life 
Riedel, who is by occupation toolmaker and teacher, has a wife and two children. He is at present a coach of BSC Freiberg and works in a middle school in Dresden as a sports teacher.

References

External links

 
 
 
 

1947 births
Living people
People from Meissen (district)
Footballers from Saxony
East German footballers
Dynamo Dresden players
German footballers
Footballers at the 1976 Summer Olympics
Olympic footballers of East Germany
Olympic gold medalists for East Germany
East Germany international footballers
Dynamo Dresden non-playing staff
Olympic medalists in football
DDR-Oberliga players
Medalists at the 1976 Summer Olympics
Association football forwards